Dylan Gambrell (born August 26, 1996) is an American professional ice hockey center for the  Ottawa Senators of the National Hockey League (NHL). He was selected 60th overall by the San Jose Sharks in the 2016 NHL Entry Draft.

Playing career
Gambrell grew up playing hockey in Kent, Washington for the Kent Valley Hockey Association thanks to his dad's roller hockey background. In order to hone his skills in preparation for a possible college hockey career, he moved to Colorado at the age of 14 to play junior hockey with the Colorado Thunderbirds of the T1EHL at the under-16 level. He was selected 11th overall in the 2012 USHL Futures draft by the Dubuque Fighting Saints of the United States Hockey League (USHL). In 2013, he won the USHL Clark Cup with Dubuque. He played three seasons with the Fighting Saints before beginning his collegiate career with the University of Denver in the National Collegiate Hockey Conference (NCHC) in the 2015–16 season. He was named to the NCHC All-Rookie Team at the end of his first year. Gambrell was selected by the San Jose Sharks of the National Hockey League (NHL) in the second round, 60th overall, in the 2016 NHL Entry Draft, but chose to return to university for another year.

Following the 2017–18 season, in which Gambrell placed third in team scoring as a junior with 43 points in 41 games, Gambrell concluded his collegiate career by signing a two-year, entry-level contract with the San Jose Sharks on March 26, 2018. He was immediately added to the Sharks playing roster, and made his NHL debut in a 4–2 defeat to the Dallas Stars on April 3, 2018. He completed the regular season going scoreless in three games.

Approaching the 2018–19 season, on October 2, 2018, he was assigned to the Sharks American Hockey League (AHL) affiliate, the San Jose Barracuda. He was recalled five days later after Joe Thornton was injured. He spent the majority of the season with the Barracuda, registering 20 goals and 45 points in 51 games. He also appeared in eight games for the Sharks. Gambrell was inserted into the playoff lineup for Game 6 after Joe Pavelski was injured in Game 5 of the 2019 Western Conference Finals.  He scored his first NHL goal versus the St. Louis Blues as the Sharks only goal during the Blues' 5–1 Game 6 victory. He finished the playoffs appearing in two games as the Sharks were eliminated by the Blues. That off-season he was re-signed by the Sharks to a two-year contract on July 11, 2019.

Gambrell appeared in 50 games in the 2019–20 season, scoring five goals and eleven points. During the 2020–21 season, Gambrell appeared in 49 games, scoring five goals and twelve points. He led the team's forwards in ice time on the penalty kill. After the 2020–21 season, he signed a one-year contract extension.

On October 9, 2021, Gambrell was placed on waivers after he was beaten out in training camp for the final spot on the Sharks roster by Jasper Weatherby. He went unclaimed and Gambrell was assigned by the Sharks to the AHL to start the  season with the San Jose Barracuda. After making two appearances with the Barracuda he was traded by the Sharks to the Ottawa Senators in exchange for a seventh-round pick in 2022 on October 24, 2021. Gambrell was recalled to Ottawa following the trade. He was acquired to provide depth following a series of injuries to Ottawa's centers. He finished the season with the Senators, registering three goals and seven points in 63 games. Gambrell signed a one-year extension with the Senators on June 15, 2022.

Career statistics

Awards and honors

References

External links

1996 births
Living people
American men's ice hockey centers
Denver Pioneers men's ice hockey players
Dubuque Fighting Saints players
Ottawa Senators players
San Jose Barracuda players
San Jose Sharks draft picks
San Jose Sharks players
Ice hockey people from Washington (state)
People from Bonney Lake, Washington